"Broken Machine" is a song written and performed by New Zealand musician Zowie. It was released digitally on 6 September 2010.

Music video
The song received an official music video in 2010; it was directed by Special Problems.

Chart performance
"Broken Machine" debuted on the New Zealand Singles Chart at number 28 on the chart dated 20 September 2010. It reached its peak position of number 9 on the chart dated 18 October 2010, in its fifth week on the chart. The song spent a total of 12 weeks on the top 40.

Track listing
Digital Single
"Broken Machine" – 3:28

Digital EP
"Broken Machine" (RAC Remix) – 3:32
"Broken Machine" (WAWA Remix) – 6:49
"Broken Machine" (Computers Want Me Dead Remix) – 4:08

References

External links
Music video for "Broken Machine" at YouTube

Zowie songs
2010 singles
2010 songs